A  (plural ) was an administrative subdivision created in a number of areas annexed by Nazi Germany between 1938 and 1945.

Overview

The  were an attempt to resolve the administrative chaos resulting from the mutually overlapping jurisdictions and different boundaries of the NSDAP Party , placed under a Party , and the federal states, under a  responsible to the Ministry of the Interior (in the Prussian provinces, the equivalent post was that of ).

There were several :
  (German: Ostmark) formed from the formerly independent Austria
 , formed from a substantial part of the German-speaking outer rim areas of the former Czechoslovakia occupied in 1938

The East March was subsequently subdivided into seven smaller , generally coterminous with the former Austrian  (federal provinces).

List of

in Austria and parts of Czechoslovakia established in 1938

established during the Second World War

(partly) formed out of pre-existing

Planned  that were never established

See also
 Administrative divisions of Nazi Germany
 Polish areas annexed by Nazi Germany

References

Citations

Sources 

  , Historical map book, published: 1990, publisher: Orbis Verlag - Munich, 
 Shoa.de - List of Gaue and Gauleiter 
    website

Sudetenland
Subdivisions of Nazi Germany
 
Types of administrative division